P.O. Fikis Football Club is a Greek football club based in Fiki, Trikala, Greece.

Honours

Domestic

 Trikala FCA Champions: 1
 2019–20
 Trikala FCA Cup:1
2021–22

Notable players
Georgios Koltsidas
 Vangelis Nasiakos

References

Association football clubs established in 1971
1971 establishments in Greece
Gamma Ethniki clubs